Fraxinus griffithii, the Himalayan ash or evergreen ash is a species of flowering tree. The natural habitat includes the Philippines, Indonesia, Vietnam, Myanmar, Taiwan, China, Bangladesh and India. This plant is commonly  grown as an ornamental in Australia, where it is an invasive species.

References 

griffithii
Flora of China
Flora of Taiwan
Flora of tropical Asia
Ornamental trees
Taxa named by Charles Baron Clarke